"Lovekiller" is a song by Swedish singer Darin, released in July 2010 as the fourth and final single from his fifth studio album of the same name. The song was written and produced by Darin and Tony Nilsson.

"Lovekiller" debuted and peaked at number 6 on the Swedish singles chart. Darin also recorded an acoustic version of "Lovekiller" as a bonus track for the album.

Track listing
iTunes Single
 Lovekiller - 3:30

Remixes EP
 Lovekiller (Redtop Radio Remix) - 3:03
 Lovekiller (Redtop Club Remix) - 5:43
 Lovekiller (Steffwell Radio mix) - 3:20
 Lovekiller (Steffwell Extended Club Remix) - 5:20

Charts

Release history

References 

2010 singles
Darin (singer) songs
Songs written by Darin (singer)
Songs written by Tony Nilsson
2010 songs
Universal Music Group singles